The Roman Catholic Metropolitan Archdiocese of Kraków is an archdiocese located in the city of Kraków in Poland. As of 2013 weekly mass attendance was 51.3% of the population (fourth highest in Poland after the  dioceses of: Tarnów-69.0%, Rzeszów-64.1% and Przemyśl-58.8%).

History
1000: Established as Diocese of Kraków from the Diocese of Poznań
October 28, 1925: Promoted as Metropolitan Archdiocese of Kraków

Special churches

Minor Basilicas:
Basilica of the Body and Blood of Christ, Kazimierz
Bazylika Najświętszego Serca Pana Jezusa, Kraków
Bazylika Nawiedzenia NMP, Kraków
Bazylika Ofiarowania Najświętszej Maryi Panny, Wadowice
Bazylika św. Floriana, Kraków (Kleparz)
Bazylika św. Franciszka z Asyżu OO. Franciszkanów, Kraków
Bazylika Trójcy Świętej OO. Dominikanów, Kraków
Bazylika Wniebowzięcia Najświętszej Marii Panny (Bazylika Mariacka), Kraków
Sanktuarium Pasyjno - Maryjne, Kalwaria Zebrzydowska
Minor & International Shrine:
Bazylika Bożego Miłosierdzia, Kraków-Łagiewniki

Leadership
List of Roman Catholic bishops of Kraków

Suffragan dioceses
Bielsko–Żywiec
Kielce
Tarnów

See also
Roman Catholicism in Poland
The Lesser Polish Way

Sources

GCatholic.org
Catholic Hierarchy
Diocese website

Krakow
10th-century establishments in Poland
1000 establishments in Europe
Christianity in Kraków
Krakow
Religious organizations established in the 1000s